Following public and private engineering institutions are there in Pakistan:

Islamabad
 Abasyn University, Peshawar, Islamabad Campus
 Air University, Islamabad
 Bahria University, Islamabad (Main Campus)
 Sir Syed CASE Institute of Technology Islamabad
 COMSATS University Islamabad (Main Campus)
 Federal Urdu University of Arts, Science & Technology, Islamabad (Main Campus)
 Hamdard Institute of Engineering and Technology, Islamabad Campus (Hamdard University, Karachi)
 Institute of Space Technology, Islamabad
 National University of Sciences and Technology (Pakistan), Islamabad
 International Islamic University, Islamabad
 Islamic International Engineering College, Islamabad (Riphah International University, Islamabad)
 Iqra University, Islamabad Campus (Iqra University, Karachi)
 Capital University of Science & Technology, Islamabad
 National University of Computer and Emerging Sciences, Islamabad (Main Campus)
 National University of Modern Languages, Islamabad (Main Campus)
 Pakistan Institute of Engineering and Applied Sciences, Islamabad
 Grafton College, Islamabad
 National University of Technology

Punjab
 COMSATS University Islamabad (Sahiwal Campus)
 Pakistan Institute of Engineering and Technology, Multan
 Army Public College of Management Sciences, Rawalpindi (University of Engineering and Technology, Taxila)
 Dr. A. Q. Khan Institute of Computer Sciences and Information Technology, Rawalpindi
 COMSATS University Islamabad (Lahore Campus)
 Sharif College of Engineering and Technology, Lahore affiliated with University of Engineering and Technology, Lahore
 COMSATS University Islamabad (Wah Campus)
 National University of Sciences and Technology (Pakistan), College of Electrical and Mechanical Engineering, Rawalpindi Campus
 HITEC University, Taxila Cantonment
 Information Technology University (Lahore)
 Institute of Advanced Materials, Bahauddin Zakariya University, Multan
 Lahore University of Management Sciences, Lahore
 National University of Sciences and Technology (Pakistan), Military College of Signals, Rawalpindi Campus
 National Textile University, Faisalabad (Main Campus)
 National University of Computer and Emerging Sciences, Islamabad, (Lahore Campus)
 National University of Computer and Emerging Sciences, Islamabad, (Chiniot Campus)
 NFC Institute of Engineering and Fertilizer Research, Faisalabad affiliated with (University of Engineering and Technology, Lahore)
 NFC Institute of Engineering and Technology, Multan)
 Swedish College of Engineering and Technology, Rahim Yar Khan affiliated with University of Engineering and Technology, Lahore
 Swedish College of Engineering And Technology, Wah Cantt affiliated with University of Engineering and Technology, Taxila
 School of Engineering, University of Management and Technology, Lahore
 University of Central Punjab, Lahore
 The University of Lahore, Lahore (Main Campus)
 University College of Engineering and Technology, Multan (Bahauddin Zakariya University, Multan)
 Bahauddin Zakariya University College of Textile Engineering, Multan (Bahauddin Zakariya University, Multan)
 University College of Engineering and Technology, Bahawalpur (Islamia University, Bahawalpur)
 University of Agriculture, Faisalabad
 University of Engineering and Technology, Taxila
 University of Chakwal
 University of Engineering and Technology, Lahore (Main Campus)
 University of Engineering and Technology, Kala Shah Kaku Campus
 University of Engineering and Technology Faisalabad Campus
 University of Engineering and Technology, Lahore (Narowal Campus)
 Rachna College of Engineering and Technology, Gujranwala constituent college of University of Engineering and Technology, Lahore
 University of Faisalabad, Faisalabad
 University of Gujrat, Gujrat
 University of Wah, Wah Cantonment
 Muhammad Nawaz Sharif University of Engineering and Technology, Multan
 Lahore Leads University
 University College of Engineering & Technology, University of Sargodha
Khawaja Fareed University of Engineering and Information Technology, Rahim Yar Khan
Quaid-e-Azam College of Engineering and Technology, Sahiwal
University of South Asia, Lahore
Namal Institute, Mianwali
Government College University, Lahore
Government College University, Faisalabad
Imperial College of Business Studies, Lahore
GIFT University, Gujranwala
Lahore College for Women University, Lahore
University of the Punjab, Lahore
Institute of Southern Punjab
 Green International University, Lahore
 Superior University

Khyber Pakhtunkhwa 
 CECOS University of Information Technology and Emerging Sciences, Peshawar
 National University of Sciences and Technology (Pakistan), College of Aeronautical Engineering, Risalpur Campus
 COMSATS University Islamabad (Abbottabad Campus)
 City University of Science and Information Technology, Peshawar
 Gandhara Institute of Science and Technology, PGS Engineering College (University of Engineering and Technology, Peshawar)
 Ghulam Ishaq Khan Institute of Engineering Sciences and Technology, Topi, Khyber Pakhtunkhwa - Swabi
 IQRA National University, Peshawar
 National University of Sciences and Technology (Pakistan), Military College of Engineering (Pakistan), Risalpur Campus
 National University of Computer and Emerging Sciences, Islamabad (Peshawar Campus)
 University of Engineering and Technology, Peshawar (Main Campus)
 University of Engineering and Technology, Peshawar (Jalozai Campus)
 University of Engineering and Technology, Peshawar (Bannu Campus)
 University of Engineering and Technology, Peshawar (Abbottabad Campus)
 University of Engineering and Technology, Peshawar (Kohat Campus)
 Peshawar College of Engineering, Peshawar (University of Engineering and Technology, Peshawar)
 Sarhad University of Science and Information Technology, Peshawar
 Abasyn University, Peshawar (Main Campus)
 Gomal University, Dera Ismail Khan
 University of Engineering and Technology, Mardan
 Pak-Austria Fachhochschule: Institute of Applied Sciences and Technology, Haripur

Sindh
 Muhammad Ali Jinnah University, Karachi
 Habib University, Karachi
 Shaheed Zulfiqar Ali Bhutto Institute of Science and Technology, Karachi
 Bahria University, Islamabad (Karachi Campus)
 Dawood University of Engineering and Technology, Karachi
 Hamdard Institute of Engineering & Technology, Karachi (Hamdard University, Karachi)
 Iqra University, Karachi (Main Campus)
 Indus University, Karachi
 DHA Suffa University, Karachi
 Institute of Business Management, Karachi
 Institute of Industrial Electronics Engineering, Karachi (NED University of Engineering and Technology, Karachi)
 Mehran University of Engineering and Technology, Jamshoro
 Mehran University College of Engineering and Technology, Shaheed Zulfiqar Ali Bhutto Campus, Khairpur Mirs (Mehran University of Engineering and Technology, Jamshoro)
 National University of Computer and Emerging Sciences, Islamabad (Karachi Campus)
 NED University of Engineering and Technology, Karachi
 National University of Sciences and Technology (Pakistan), Pakistan Navy Engineering College, Karachi
 Karachi Institute of Economics and Technology (PAF-KIET), Karachi
 Quaid-e-Awam University of Engineering, Science and Technology, Nawabshah
 Quaid-e-Awam University College of Engineering, Science and Technology, Larkana (Quaid-e-Awam University of Engineering, Science and Technology, Nawabshah)
 Sir Syed University of Engineering and Technology, Karachi
 Sindh Agriculture University, Tando Jam
 National Textile University, Faisalabad (Karachi Campus)
 Sukkur IBA University, Sukkur
 Usman Institute of Technology, Karachi (NED University, Karachi)
 University of Karachi, Karachi
 Salim Habib University, Karachi
 Nazeer Hussain University, Karachi
 University of Sindh, Jamshoro
 Ziauddin University

Balochistan
 Balochistan University of Engineering and Technology, Khuzdar
 Balochistan University of Information Technology, Engineering and Management Sciences, Quetta (Takatu Campus)

Azad Jammu and Kashmir
 Mirpur University of Science and Technology, Mirpur, Azad Kashmir
 University of Azad Jammu and Kashmir, Muzaffarabad, Azad Kashmir

See also
 Pakistan Engineering Council
 Washington Accord
 Regulation and licensure in engineering
 Higher Education Commission (Pakistan)
 List of universities in Pakistan
 List of computing schools in Pakistan
 List of business schools in Pakistan

References

Engineering universities and colleges in Pakistan
Lists of engineering schools